Adecatumumab (MT201) is a recombinant human IgG1 monoclonal antibody which is used to target tumor cells. It binds to the epithelial cell adhesion molecule (EpCAM - CD326), with the intent to trigger antibody-dependent cellular cytotoxicity. It was developed by Micromet Inc, which was acquired by Amgen.

Adecatumumab has been used in clinical studies of treatment in colorectal, prostate and breast cancers. Phase II results were published in 2010.

References 

Monoclonal antibodies for tumors
Experimental cancer drugs
Abandoned drugs